Maireana aphylla, also known as cotton bush or leafless bluebush,  is a leafless (or almost leafless) shrub that is endemic to Australia.

The species occurs in all mainland states and territories apart from the Australian Capital Territory.

Gallery

References
 
 
PlantNET – New South Wales Flora Online Maireana aphylla

External links

 Maireana aphylla (photo)

Flora of New South Wales
Flora of the Northern Territory
Flora of Queensland
Flora of South Australia
Flora of Victoria (Australia)
aphylla
Caryophyllales of Australia